Ferlin Eugene Husky (December 3, 1925 – March 17, 2011) was an early American country music singer who was equally adept at the genres of traditional honky-tonk, ballads, spoken recitations, and rockabilly pop tunes. He had two dozen top-20 hits in the Billboard country charts between 1953 and 1975; his versatility and matinee-idol looks propelled a seven-decade entertainment career.

In the 1950s and 1960s, Husky's hits included "Gone" and "Wings of a Dove", each reaching number one on the country charts. He also created a comic outspoken hayseed character, Simon Crum; and recorded under the stage name Terry Preston from 1948 to 1953. In 2010, Husky was inducted into the Country Music Hall of Fame.

Biography
Husky was born in Gumbo, Missouri, an unincorporated community in northwestern St. Francois County, Missouri. His mother named him Furland, but his name was misspelled on his birth certificate. Husky grew up on a farm near Flat River and attended school in Irondale. He learned guitar from an uncle. After dropping out of high school, Husky moved to St. Louis, where he worked as a truck driver and steel mill worker while performing in honky tonks at night.

During World War II, Husky served in the United States Merchant Marine for five years, entertaining troops on transport ships. His Crum character evolved from stories he told at the time about a Missouri neighbor named Simon Crump. His website states that his ship participated in the D-Day invasion of Cherbourg.

After the war, Husky continued to develop the Crum character while working as a disc jockey in Missouri and then Bakersfield, California, in the late 1940s. He began using the moniker Terry Preston at the suggestion of Smiley Burnette, who claimed Ferlin Husky would never work on a marquee. As a honky-tonk singer, Husky signed with Capitol Records in 1953 under the guidance of Cliffie Stone, also the manager for Tennessee Ernie Ford. With Capitol Records, he returned to using his given name. A few singles failed, before "A Dear John Letter" with Jean Shepard became a number-one hit. The follow-up was called "Forgive Me John". In 1955, Husky had a solo hit with "I Feel Better All Over (More Than Anywheres Else)" / "Little Tom". As Simon Crum, he signed a separate contract with Capitol Records and began releasing records, the biggest of which was 1959's "Country Music is Here to Stay" (number two for three weeks).

In the late 1950s, Husky had a long string of hits, including the number-one "Gone" in 1957 (he first recorded "Gone" as Terry Preston in 1952, but the earlier version lacked the strings and backup singers of the newly emerging Nashville sound). "Gone" was a crossover success, also reaching number four on the pop music chart. It sold over one million copies, and was awarded a gold disc. The song's popularity led to a stint as a summer replacement host in 1957 on CBS-TV's Arthur Godfrey's Talent Scouts.

He began acting, appearing on Kraft Television Theatre, and portraying himself in the 1957 film Mister Rock and Roll (his website states he had bit parts in 18 films, including with Zsa Zsa Gabor and Mamie Van Doren). He received sole top billing in a 1971 low-budget backcountry film (the film's opening credits state, "Ferlin Husky in Swamp Girl"). Bob Ferguson's "Wings of a Dove" became his biggest hit in 1960, topping the country charts for 10 weeks and attaining number 12 on the pop chart. Husky was also known for his ability to mimic other popular country singers, including Tennessee Ernie Ford and Kitty Wells.

Although he did not have more chart-toppers, he charted three dozen hits between 1961 and 1972, with the biggest being "Once" (1967) and "Just for You" (1968). In late 1972, after over 20 years with Capitol, Husky signed with ABC Records, where he scored several top-40 hits into 1975, with the biggest being the top-20 "Rosie Cries a Lot" (1973). Husky briefly retired in 1977 following heart surgery, but resumed touring. He remained a popular concert draw, performing at the Grand Ole Opry and elsewhere. He was married four times and for the last six years of his life lived with his long-time love, Leona Williams (former wife of Merle Haggard).

Husky suffered from cardiopathy for many years and was hospitalized several times beginning in the late 1970s, including for heart surgery in 2005 and for blood clots in his legs in 2007. He was admitted to St. John's Hospital in Springfield, Missouri, on April 19, 2009, with congestive heart failure and pneumonia. On July 15, 2009, his spokesman said he was recuperating at home after being released from a Nashville hospital. As recently as 2009, he lived in Vienna, Missouri.

On February 23, 2010, the Country Music Association announced his induction into the Country Music Hall of Fame. He was heralded for his vocal and comic prowess—and "all around showmanship"—that left a legacy as "one of the best entertainers country music has ever produced".

On January 16, 2011, Husky was honored at West St. Francois County High School in Leadwood, Missouri, where local singers and the high-school choir sang some of his hits. Husky also donated several items of memorabilia, including his Country Music Hall of Fame award, to the city of Leadwood. They will be permanently stored at the high school.

On March 8, 2011, Husky was hospitalized again after several days of not feeling well. By the weekend, he had improved and was preparing to move out of the coronary care unit, but on March 17, Husky died at his daughter's home in Westmoreland, Tennessee, of congestive heart failure.

He was interred next to his son, Danny Louis Husky, in Hendersonville Memory Gardens in Hendersonville, Tennessee.

Honors
Husky was one of the first country singers to get a star on the Hollywood Walk of Fame (for recording) at 6675 Hollywood Blvd.

The street that runs through the city park in Leadwood, Missouri, is named for him.

Discography

Albums
{| class="wikitable"
! Year
! Album
! US Country
! Label
|-
| 1956
| Songs of the Home and Heart
|
| rowspan="4"| Capitol
|-
| 1957
| Boulevard of Broken Dreams
|
|-
| 1958
| Sittin' on a Rainbow
|
|-
| rowspan="2"| 1959
| Born to Lose
|
|-
| Ferlin Husky
|
| rowspan="2"| King
|-
| rowspan="3"| 1960
| Easy Livin|
|-
| Ferlin's Favorites
|
| rowspan="24"| Capitol
|-
| "Gone"
|
|-
| rowspan="2"| 1961
| Walkin' and a Hummin|
|-
| Memories of Home
|
|-
| 1962
| Some of My Favorites
|
|-
| rowspan="3"| 1963
| The Unpredictable Simon Crum
|
|-
| The Heart and Soul of Ferlin Husky
|
|-
| The Hits of Ferlin Husky
|
|-
| 1964
| By Request
| align="center"| 20
|-
| 1965
| True True Lovin'''
|
|-
| rowspan="2"| 1966
| Ferlin Husky Sings the Songs of Music City, U.S.A.| align="center"| 20
|-
| I Could Sing All Night| align="center"| 18
|-
| rowspan="2"| 1967
| What Am I Gonna Do Now?| align="center"| 22
|-
| Christmas All Year Long|
|-
| rowspan="3"| 1968
| Just for You (and the Hush Puppies)
| align="center"| 19
|-
| Where No One Stands Alone|
|-
| White Fences and Evergreen Trees| align="center"| 44
|-
| rowspan="2"| 1969
| The Best of Ferlin Husky| align="center"| 42
|-
| That's Why I Love You So Much| align="center"| 24
|-
| rowspan="3"| 1970
| Your Love Is Heavenly Sunshine| align="center"| 25
|-
| Green Green Grass of Home|
|-
| Your Sweet Love Lifted Me| align="center"| 31
|-
| 1971
| One More Time| align="center"| 35
|-
| 1972
| Just Plain Lonely| align="center"| 39
|-
| rowspan="2"| 1973
| True True Lovin
|
| rowspan="5"| ABC
|-
| Sweet Honky Tonk|
|-
| rowspan="2"| 1974
| Freckles and Polliwog Days| align="center"| 44
|-
| Champagne Ladies and Blue Ribbon Babies| align="center"| 43
|-
| 1975
| Foster and Rice Songbook|
|}

Singles
{| class="wikitable"
! rowspan="2"| Year
! rowspan="2"| Single
! colspan="3"| Chart Positions
! rowspan="2"| Album
|-
! width="45"| US Country
! width="45"| US
! width="45"| CAN Country
|-
| rowspan="2"| 1953
| "A Dear John Letter" (w/ Jean Shepard)
| align="center"| 1
| align="center"| 4
|
| rowspan="4"| singles only
|-
| "Forgive Me, John" (w/ Jean Shepard)
| align="center"| 4
| align="center"| 24
|
|-
| rowspan="4"| 1955
| "I Feel Better All Over (More Than Anywhere's Else)"
| align="center"| 6
|
|
|-
| "Little Tom"
| align="center"| 7
|
|
|-
| "Cuzz Yore So Sweet" (as Simon Crum)
| align="center"| 5
|
|
| The Unpredictable Simon Crum|-
| "I'll Baby Sit with You" (w/ His Hush Puppies)
| align="center"| 14
|
|
| single only
|-
| rowspan="3"| 1957
| "Gone"
| align="center"| 1
| align="center"| 4
|
| rowspan="4"| "Gone"|-
| "A Fallen Star"
| align="center"| 8
| align="center"| 47
|
|-
| "Prize Possession"
| align="center"| 12
|
|
|-
| rowspan="2"| 1958
| "I Will"
| align="center"| 23
|
|
|-
| "Country Music is Here to Stay" (as Simon Crum)
| align="center"| 2
|
|
| The Unpredictable Simon Crum|-
| rowspan="3"| 1959
| "My Reason for Living"
| align="center"| 14
|
|
| "Gone"|-
| "Draggin' the River"
| align="center"| 11
|
|
| rowspan="4"| singles only
|-
| "Black Sheep"
| align="center"| 21
|
|
|-
| 1960
| "Wings of a Dove"
| align="center"| 1
| align="center"| 12
|
|-
| 1961
| "Willow Tree"
| align="center"| 23
|
|
|-
| rowspan="4"| 1962
| "The Waltz You Saved for Me"
| align="center"| 13
| align="center"| 94
|
| Some of My Favorites|-
| "Somebody Save Me"
| align="center"| 16
|
|
| rowspan="3"| singles only
|-
| "Stand Up"
| align="center"| 28
|
|
|-
| "It Was You"
| align="center"| 21
|
|
|-
| 1964
| "Timber I'm Falling"
| align="center"| 13
|
|
| By Request|-
| rowspan="2"| 1965
| "True True Lovin'"
| align="center"| 46
|
|
| True True Lovin
|-
| "Money Greases the Wheels"
| align="center"| 48
|
|
| Ferlin Husky Sings the Songs of Music City, U.S.A.|-
| rowspan="2"| 1966
| "I Could Sing All Night"
| align="center"| 27
|
|
| rowspan="3"| I Could Sing All Night|-
| "I Hear Little Rock Calling"
| align="center"| 17
|
|
|-
| rowspan="3"| 1967
| "Once"
| align="center"| 4
|
|
|-
| "What Am I Gonna Do Now"
| align="center"| 37
|
|
| What Am I Gonna Do Now?|-
| "You Pushed Me Too Far"
| align="center"| 14
|
|
| rowspan="2"| Just for You|-
| rowspan="3"| 1968
| "Just for You"
| align="center"| 4
|
|
|-
| "I Promised You the World"
| align="center"| 26
|
| align="center"| 13
| single only
|-
| "White Fences and Evergreen Trees"
| align="center"| 25
|
| align="center"| 18
| rowspan="2"| White Fences and Evergreen Trees|-
| rowspan="3"| 1969
| "Flat River, MO"
| align="center"| 33
|
|
|-
| "That's Why I Love You So Much"
| align="center"| 16
|
| align="center"| 11
| That's Why I Love You So Much|-
| "Every Step of the Way"
| align="center"| 21
|
| align="center"| 23
| rowspan="2"| Your Love Is Heavenly Sunshine|-
| rowspan="2"| 1970
| "Heavenly Sunshine"
| align="center"| 11
|
| align="center"| 6
|-
| "Your Sweet Love Lifted Me"
| align="center"| 45
|
|
| rowspan="3"| One More Time|-
| rowspan="3"| 1971
| "Sweet Misery"
| align="center"| 14
|
| align="center"| 23
|-
| "One More Time"
| align="center"| 28
|
| align="center"| 31
|-
| "Open Up the Book (And Take a Look)"
| align="center"| 45
|
|
| single only
|-
| rowspan="2"| 1972
| "Just Plain Lonely"
| align="center"| 39
|
|
| Just Plain Lonely|-
| "How Could You Be Anything But Love"
| align="center"| 53
|
|
| single only
|-
| rowspan="4"| 1973
| "True True Lovin'" (re-recording)
| align="center"| 35
|
| align="center"| 29
| True True Lovin'|-
| "Between Me and Blue"
| align="center"| 46
|
| align="center"| 75
| rowspan="3"| Sweet Honky Tonk|-
| "Baby's Blue"
| align="center"| 75
|
|
|-
| "Rosie Cries a Lot"
| align="center"| 17
|
| align="center"| 33
|-
| rowspan="2"| 1974
| "Freckles and Polliwog Days"
| align="center"| 26
|
| align="center"| 36
| rowspan="2"| Freckles and Polliwog Days|-
| "A Room for a Boy...Never Used"
| align="center"| 60
|
|
|-
| rowspan="4"| 1975
| "Champagne Ladies and Blue Ribbon Babies"
| align="center"| 34
|
|
| rowspan="2"| Champagne Ladies and Blue Ribbon Babies|-
| "Burning"
| align="center"| 37
|
|
|-
| "An Old Memory (Got in My Eye)"
| align="center"| 90
|
|
| rowspan="2"| Foster and Rice Songbook|-
| "She's Not Yours Anymore"
| align="center"| 74
|
|
|}

Notes

References
Roy, Don. (1998). "Ferlin Husky". In The Encyclopedia of Country Music''. Paul Kingsbury, Editor. New York: Oxford University Press. p. 252. (Birth year listed as 1927).

External links

 
 Simon Crum website
 

1925 births
2011 deaths
People from St. Francois County, Missouri
American country singer-songwriters
American male singer-songwriters
American sailors
United States Merchant Mariners of World War II
Grand Ole Opry members
Four Star Records artists
Capitol Records artists
Apex Records artists
Country Music Hall of Fame inductees
Bakersfield sound
Members of the Country Music Association
Singer-songwriters from Missouri
Country musicians from Missouri